Chenghua (27 January 1465 – 13 January 1488) was the era name of the Chenghua Emperor, the ninth emperor of the Ming dynasty of China. The Ming dynasty used the era name Chenghua for a total of 23 years.

On 22 September 1487 (Chenghua 23, 6th day of the 9th month), the Hongzhi Emperor ascended to the throne and continued to use. The era was changed to Hongzhi in the following year.

Births

Deaths
 1473 (Chenghua 9) – Ke Qian (柯潛), Ming literati (b. 1423)
 1474 (Chenghua 10) – Gedun Drupa, 1st Dalai Lama (b. 1391)
 1474 (Chenghua 10) – Du Qiong (杜瓊), Ming painter (b. 1396)
 1474 (Chenghua 10) – Ye Sheng (葉盛), Ming scholar (b. 1420)
 1487 (Chenghua 23) – Zhu Jianshen, Ming emperor (b. 1447)

Comparison table

Other regime era names that existed during the same period
 China
 Desheng (德勝, 1465–1466): Ming period — era name of Liu Tong (劉通)
 Vietnam
 Quang Thuận (光順, 1460–1469): Later Lê dynasty — era name of Lê Thánh Tông
 Hồng Đức (洪德, 1470–1497): Later Lê dynasty — era name of Lê Thánh Tông
 Japan
 Kanshō (寛正, 1460–1466): era name of Emperor Go-Hanazono and Emperor Go-Tsuchimikado
 Bunshō (文正, 1466–1467): era name of Emperor Go-Tsuchimikado
 Ōnin (応仁, 1467–1469): era name of Emperor Go-Tsuchimikado
 Bunmei (文明, 1469–1487): era name of Emperor Go-Tsuchimikado
 Chōkyō (長享, 1487–1489): era name of Emperor Go-Tsuchimikado

See also
 List of Chinese era names
 List of Ming dynasty era names

References

Further reading

Ming dynasty eras